is a privately owned school for boys based in Nerima, Tokyo, Japan.

History 
The school was founded in 1922 by industrialist Nezu Kaichirō, as Musashi High School. The school was one of the first institutions of its type to use a seven-year system of education, taking students up to the equivalent of the first two years of university under the current system of education. Musashi became a prototype for the modern integrated junior and senior high schools that now prevails throughout Japan. After the education reforms of 1948, the school was divided into Musashi Senior High School and Musashi Junior High School. Musashi University was founded in 1949 and forms part of the same legal entity.

Admissions
The school operates a highly selective admissions program attracting students from across the city. Graduates have been successful in gaining admission to many of Japan's most selective universities. The school is unusual in the fact that it has few written rules and has no uniform or required dress code; reflecting one of the school's founding principles being that it aims to produce graduates that are "individuals", "capable of independent thought and research."

Notable alumni 
Akito Arima (1930-2020) Physicist, Minister of Education 1998–1999.
Toshiro Fujita (1948–) Physician-scientist
Yoshitsugu Harada (1952–) Politician
Hiroshi Hoketsu (1941–) Equestrian
Shinya Inoué (1921–2019) Biophysicist
Ken Itō (1935–) Composer
Kenkichi Iwasawa (1917–1998) Mathematician, Cole Prize
Tamio Kageyama (1947–1998) Novelist
Seiji Kameda (1964–) Music producer
Seiji Kihara (1970–) Politician, Senior Vice-Minister of Foreign Affairs 2015-NOW.
Takeaki Matsumoto (1959–) Politician, Minister of Foreign Affairs 2011.
Hiroshi Miyazawa (1921–2012) Minister of Justice 1995–1996.
Kiichi Miyazawa (1919–2007) Prime Minister 1991–1993.
Taizo Nishimuro (1935–2017) CEO of Japan Post Holdings
Yoshinobu Nishizaki (1934–2010) Film producer
Shōichi Saba (1919–2012) former CEO of Toshiba
Toshitsugu Saito (1944–) Politician, Director General of the Defense Agency 2000–2001.
Isao Sasaki (1942–) Actor
Masahiko Shibayama (1965–) Politician, Senior Vice-Minister for Internal Affairs and Communications 2012–2013.
Tsuneo Tamagawa (1925–) Mathematician
Naoki Tanaka (1940–) Minister of Defence 2012.
Morikazu Toda (1917–2010) Physicist
Hiroomi Umezawa (1924–1995) Physicist
Eiiti Wada (1931–) Computer-scientist

References

External links
 Official website

Junior high schools in Japan
High schools in Tokyo
Educational institutions established in 1922
Private schools in Japan
Private schools in Tokyo
Nerima
1922 establishments in Japan